The Phoebus cartel was an oligopoly that controlled the manufacture and sale of incandescent light bulbs. They appropriated market territories and lowered the useful life of such bulbs. Corporations based in Europe and the United States founded the cartel on January 15, 1925 in Geneva. Phoebus based itself in Switzerland. The corporation named itself Phœbus S.A. Compagnie Industrielle pour le Développement de l'Éclairage (French for "Phoebus plc Industrial Company for the Development of Lighting"). They had intended the cartel to last for thirty years (1925 to 1955). The cartel ceased operations in 1939 owing to the outbreak of World War II. The cartel included manufacturers Osram, General Electric, Associated Electrical Industries, and Philips, among others.

History 
Osram, Philips, Tungsram, Associated Electrical Industries, Compagnie des Lampes, International General Electric, and the GE Overseas Group created and joined the Phoebus cartel, holding shares in the Swiss corporation proportional to their lamp sales.

Osram founded a precursor organisation in 1921, the Internationale Glühlampen Preisvereinigung. When Philips and other manufacturers entered the American market, General Electric reacted by setting up the "International General Electric Company" in Paris. Both organisations co-ordinated the trading of patents and market penetration. Increasing international competition led to negotiations among all the major companies to control and restrict their respective activities in order not to interfere in each other's spheres.

The Phoebus cartel was intended to be dissolved in 1955 but World War II greatly disrupted its operation.

Purpose 

The cartel lowered operational costs and worked to standardize the life expectancy of light bulbs at 1,000 hours (down from 2,500 hours), and raised prices without fear of competition, in what has been described as a "classic example of planned obsolescence". The cartel tested their bulbs and fined manufacturers for bulbs that lasted more than 1,000 hours. A 1929 table listed the amount of Swiss francs paid that depended on the exceeding hours of lifetime.

Some engineers deemed 1,000 hours a reasonable figure to balance the various operational aspects of an incandescent bulb, since longer lifespan means reduced efficacy (lumens per watt): a longer-life bulb of a given wattage puts out less light (and therefore proportionally more heat) than a shorter-life bulb of the same wattage. Nevertheless, long-life incandescent bulbs were and are available with lifespan ratings up to 2,500 hours, and these do in fact produce less light per watt.

In 1951, Monopolies and Restrictive Practices Commission in the United Kingdom issued a report to Parliament and noted that: "As regards life standards, before the Phoebus Agreement and to this day the general service filament lamp was and is designed to have, on average, a minimum life of 1,000 hours. It has often been alleged—though not in evidence to us—that the Phoebus organisation artificially made the life of a lamp short with the object of increasing the number of lamps sold. As we have explained in Chapter 9, there can be no absolutely right life for the many varying circumstances to be found among the consumers in any given country, so that any standard life must always represent a compromise between conflicting factors. B.S.I, has always adopted a single life standard for general service filament lamps, and the representatives of both B.S.I, and B.E.A., as well as most lamp manufacturers, have told us in evidence that they regard 1,000 hours as the best compromise possible at the present time, nor has an evidence been offered to us to the contrary. Accordingly we must dismiss as misconceived the allegation referred to above."

In popular culture
In Gravity's Rainbow (1973), Thomas Pynchon wrote about "Byron the Bulb", an anthropomorphic eternal lightbulb who fights against the Phoebus Cartel. Pynchon's story has been credited with bringing the Phoebus Cartel to the public eye.

See also
Planned obsolescence
Centennial Light

References

Further reading

External links 
 Patrick Gaughen "Structural Inefficiency in the Early Twentieth Century: Studies in the Aluminum and Incandescent Lamp Markets" Social Science 610, December, 1998, 36 pp.
 U K Monopolies Commission "Report on the Supply of Electric Lamps", His Majesty's Stationery Office, London, October 1951, v + 199 pp.
 Markus Krajewski "The Great Lightbulb Conspiracy" IEEE Spectrum, September, 2014.
 Cosima Dannoritzer "The Light Bulb Conspiracy - Extended Video Version" New World News Network, August 8, 2016
 Planet Money Podcast "Episode 902: The Phoebus Cartel" npr.org, 27 March 2019

Cartels
Incandescent light bulbs
Organisations based in Geneva
1925 establishments in Switzerland
1938 disestablishments in Switzerland